Tanyu may refer to:

 Tanyu Kiryakov, Bulgarian pistol shooter
 Hikmet Tanyu, Turkish scientist
 Tan Yu, a Chinese businessman
 Tanyu (town), in Zhenlai County, Jilin, China

Turkish-language surnames